Mistřice is a municipality and village in Uherské Hradiště District in the Zlín Region of the Czech Republic. It has about 1,200 inhabitants.

Administrative parts
The village of Javorovec is an administrative part of Mistřice.

References

Villages in Uherské Hradiště District